Lance Marell Briggs (born November 12, 1980) is an American former professional football player who was a linebacker for the Chicago Bears of the National Football League (NFL). He played college football for the Arizona Wildcats and was selected by the Chicago Bears in the third round of the 2003 NFL Draft, where he played his entire 12-year career. He was a seven-time Pro Bowl selection.

Early years
A Sacramento, California native, Briggs attended Elk Grove High School in Elk Grove, California.  While at Arizona, he was a two-time first-team All-Pac-10 Conference selection as a linebacker for the Arizona Wildcats football team.  Briggs finished his college career with 308 tackles, 10.5 sacks, 36 tackles for losses, three interceptions, 10 passes deflected, five forced fumbles and four fumble recoveries in 33 games at strong side linebacker.

Professional career

Chicago Bears
The Chicago Bears selected Briggs in the third round (68th overall) of the 2003 NFL Draft. Briggs was the 13th linebacker drafted in 2003.

On July 25, 2003, the Chicago Bears signed Briggs to a four-year, $2.06 million contract that includes a signing bonus of $690,000. Throughout training camp, Briggs competed to be a starting outside linebacker against veteran Bryan Knight. Head coach Dick Jauron named Briggs a backup outside linebacker to start his rookie season, behind Bryan Knight and Warrick Holdman.

He made his professional regular season debut during the Chicago Bears' season-opener at the San Francisco 49ers and made one solo tackle as they lost 49-7. On October 5, 2003, Briggs earned his first career start and recorded one solo tackle during a 24-21 win against the Oakland Raiders in Week 4. In Week 9, Briggs collected a season-high 11 combined tackles (seven solo) during a 12-10 loss at the Detroit Lions. On December 7, 2003, Briggs recorded nine combined tackles (seven solo), deflected two passes, and intercepted a pass which he returned for the first touchdown of his career during a 34-21 loss at the Green Bay Packers in Week 13. Briggs made his first career interception off a pass by Packers' quarterback Brett Favre and returned it for a 45-yard touchdown during the first quarter. He finished his rookie season in 2003 with 78 combined tackles (65 solo), four passes defended, one interception, and one touchdown in 16 games and 13 starts.

In 2004, he made 126 tackles and was elected as a second alternate to the Pro Bowl.

In 2005, Briggs was selected to represent the National Football Conference in the 2006 Pro Bowl. However, Briggs drew controversy when he refused to attend the Bears' summer camp, resulting in a temporary demotion.

He finished the 2006 Chicago Bears season as a clutch performer on the Bears' defense. Briggs was selected to play in the 2007 Pro Bowl, but opted to decline the invitation because of an injured foot. He became a free agent following the 2007 playoffs, leaving his future with the Bears in the air.  Despite Briggs’ high price tag, commentary from  NFL on Fox revealed Brian Urlacher was willing to take a pay-cut in order to keep Briggs on the team. On February 16, 2007, the Bears officially placed the franchise tag on him, which guarantees him a one-year contract for the 2007 NFL season at slightly more than $7.2 million.

On the morning of March 3, 2007, Briggs was featured on the Mike North Morning Show, and stated he was upset with the amount of money he was currently earning. Briggs later stated he enjoys his teammates, coaches and fans, but was fed up with the organization. He later went on to state he no longer wanted to be a Bear, and demanded a trade. Briggs also made his unhappiness known in a March 2007 interview with a Chicago radio station in which he said "I'll do everything that's within my power to not be with this organization."

On March 12, 2007, Briggs announced that he no longer considered himself a member of the Chicago Bears. During a cell phone interview with Foxsports.com Briggs said "I am now prepared to sit out the year if the Bears don't trade me or release me, I've played my last snap for them. I'll never play another down for Chicago again." In explaining his demands, he said "The Bears have shown I'm not in their long-term plans so if that's the case, I don't want to be here." A report from Fox Sports on March 27 claimed that the Washington Redskins allegedly offered the Bears their first round pick in exchange for Briggs and the Bears' own first round pick. On March 28, Bears general manager Jerry Angelo confirmed that the Redskins have made a trade offer and stated, "We'll evaluate if that's good for us and get back to them". Angelo rejected the offer on April 3, but later stated they were interested in negotiating a deal the following day. The Bears then proposed a trade with the Redskins which included linebacker Rocky McIntosh as well as the Redskins first-round pick in exchange for Briggs. Briggs did not attend the team's first meeting after their Super Bowl XLI loss, or their mandatory mini camp session in May 2007. Despite his comments, the Bears re-signed Briggs to a six-year, $36 million contract on March 1, 2008.

On September 2, 2011 Briggs and his agent, Drew Rosenhaus, formally asked the Bears organization for a trade, with three years left on his six-year contract. The request came after Briggs asked the Bears for a raise.

Briggs made the 2012 Pro Bowl team, but was unable to play due to an ankle injury.

On April 11, 2012, Briggs was given a one-year extension, increasing his contract through 2014. In week 7 of 2013 against the Washington Redskins, Briggs suffered a fracture in his shoulder. He rejoined the Bears in week 16, a 54-11 loss to the Philadelphia Eagles.

Briggs recorded 24 tackles and one interception during the 2014 NFL season. After starting the season as the Bears' weak-side linebacker, Briggs was injured during week 5 and missed three games. He commented that his future with the team was in jeopardy, as he was in the final year of his contract. Briggs returned to play four more games, but injured his groin muscle during a week 13 game against the Detroit Lions. The Bears subsequently placed Briggs on their injury reserve list. He retired on September 2, 2015.

Briggs became a free agent but remained unsigned through the offseason. He announced his retirement on September 9.

NFL statistics

Key
 GP: games played
 COMB: combined tackles
 TOTAL: total tackles
 AST: assisted tackles
 SACK: sacks
 FF: forced fumbles
 FR: fumble recoveries
 FR YDS: fumble return yards 
 INT: interceptions
 IR YDS: interception return yards
 AVG IR: average interception return
 LNG: longest interception return
 TD: interceptions returned for touchdown
 PD: passes defensed

Personal life
In August 2007, Briggs crashed his new Lamborghini Murcielago into a light pole. He then left the scene of the accident and reported his car stolen. He was charged with leaving the scene of an accident. He was also cited for failure to give immediate notice of an accident and improper lane usage.

Briggs currently serves as a Bears analyst for NBC Sports Chicago's Football Aftershow, working alongside host David Kaplan and former teammate Alex Brown, and former Bears head coach Dave Wannstedt.

Briggs is a lifelong comic book reader and fan. In 2020, alongside Kyle Higgins and Danilo Beyruth, he co-created The Trap, a science fiction original graphic novel, on Kickstarter, which is set to be published in 2021.

References

External links
 Official Website
 Chicago Bears bio

1980 births
Living people
African-American players of American football
American football outside linebackers
Arizona Wildcats football players
Chicago Bears players
National Conference Pro Bowl players
Players of American football from Sacramento, California
Sportspeople from Elk Grove, California
Sportspeople from Los Angeles County, California
21st-century African-American sportspeople
20th-century African-American people